"Ladybug" is the second single from The Presidents of the United States of America's album These Are the Good Times People. On November 4, 2008 the song was released as downloadable content for the video game Rock Band along with the songs "Dune Buggy" and "Feather Pluckn" as the Presidents of the United States of America Pack 01.

Music video
The music video for "Ladybug" features a 2D animation style and follows a superhero ladybug on its way to rescue her lover. The video features human-like characters that each seem to possess parts and characteristic of various bugs. The video's unique style shows characters that are drawn almost entirely in black on top of fully colored backgrounds.

References

External links
 "Ladybug" music video on YouTube

2008 singles
The Presidents of the United States of America (band) songs
Songs written by Chris Ballew
2008 songs
Tooth & Nail Records singles